Lynk & Co 02 is a compact car manufactured by Geely-owned Chinese-Swedish automaker Lynk & Co, the second vehicle from the brand. It was announced in March 2018, and went on sale in June 2018.

Overview
The 02 first made its appearance in documents as the "CC11", and was later renamed Lynk & Co 02 as the brand developed. It went on sale in June 2018 in China.

Befitting a premium marque, the 02 is equipped with a rich set of features as standard and optional, such as active safety, panoramic cameras, panoramic sunroof, steering headlights, and automatic parking. 

In March 2021, the hatchback version of the 02 was revealed.

Engines
Lynk & Co 02 is available with the following engines:

Sales
Sales of the 02 started in China, in June 2018. 

By March 2019, 21,751 units of the 02 had been sold.

Gallery

References 

02
Cars introduced in 2018